Toddy Edwards was a former Australian professional soccer player who played as a forward for Blackstone and the Australia national soccer team.

International career
Edwards played his first and only international match for Australia on 7 June 1924 against Canada in a very controversial selection. Some of Edwards' teammates had refused to play after his only game for Australia when Bill Mitchell was initially going to be selected to play instead of Edwards.

Referee career
After his end in his club career, Edwards became a referee. He first controlled the 1936 Tristram Shield Final between Milton and Booval Stars at Lang Park. He was also selected as the referee for his first international match as referee with teams Australia and India in August 1938.

Career statistics

International

References

Australian soccer players
Association football forwards
Australia international soccer players
Year of birth missing
Year of death missing